Jilin may refer to:

Places
Jilin, formerly romanized as Kirin, a province in Northeast China
Jilin City, second-largest city and former capital of Jilin province
Jilin Subdistrict (吉林街道), a subdistrict in Erdao District, Changchun, Jilin province
Jilin Township (鸡林乡), a township in Jidong County, Heilongjiang province

People
Xu Jilin, Chinese professor of history
Zhang Jilin (born 1986), Chinese chess player

See also
Jilin Aodong (disambiguation)